Eliezer Paul-Gindiri, nicknamed Snappy Gilmore, is a Nigerian American Amateur Golfer who is known for his distinctive single-handed golf swing. First gaining popularity after a 2021 viral video, he was invited in 2022 by PGA of America and PGA Tour to share his technique with PGA pros.

Career 
Prior to entering golf he played soccer at Contra Costa College. On February 28, 2021, a video garnered five million views on TikTok, featuring him playing golf with at Diablo Creek Golf Course in Concord, California. His driving technique with a golf club which garnered him and his synonymous technique the nickname Snappy Gilmore, an homage to the film Happy Gilmore, caused him to be featured on Barstool Sports, Golf Magazine, Sports Illustrated, and SportsCenter. Genesis Motor sponsored a friendly match between three-time PGA Tour winner Max Homa and Paul-Gindiri on March 15, 2022, the video compared Paul-Gindiri's drive against Homa's more traditional two handed swing, in jest they both declared the result of the games as a tie.

References

External links

American male golfers
Nigerian male athletes
PGA Tour golfers
People from Concord, California
Living people
Year of birth missing (living people)
Contra Costa College alumni